A police village was a form of municipal government that was used in the province of Ontario, Canada in the early 19th century if the finances or the population of an area did not permit the creation of a village.

Formation
In the early 19th Century, the Parliament of Upper Canada established "boards of police" in municipalities that were not large enough to justify the creation of a municipal council.

The creation of "police villages" was authorized in 1850 upon the passage of the Baldwin Act by the Parliament of the Province of Canada, and was continued by the Legislative Assembly of Ontario in 1873. The law relating to them remained essentially unchanged until 1965, when the ability to create new police villages was abolished.

The rules governing the formation of police villages were as follows:

Where the locality straddled two or more counties, the council of the county that had the largest portion of the locality was the one that could establish the police village.
If an expansion of a police village involved an extension into another county, it could not occur without the consent of the other county council.
After the Ontario Municipal Board was established, such erections and expansions could not occur without its approval, and it also had direct power to erect and expand police villages if a county council has failed to act on a petition and if the locality was within one of the provisional judicial districts.

Almost all of the communities that once held that status have since been erected into villages, towns, or cities or amalgamated into other municipalities. Russell still exists as such a body.

Police villages were dissolved with provincial acts creating new municipalities. In 1971, the creation of York Region resulted in the dissolution of Holland Landing, King City, Maple, Mount Albert, Nobleton, Queensville, Schomberg, Sharon, Thornhill, and Unionville as police villages. The responsibilities of the police village boards were shifted to other boards or the municipality to which the police village was amalgamated. For example, the trustees of the police village of King City were deemed a commission for the King City Hydro-Electric System, which became a local board of the township of King with full transfer of all rights and obligations.

Police villages

References

Further reading

External links

Types of administrative division
Local government in Ontario
Police divisions